Mixtla de Altamirano is a municipality in Veracruz, Mexico. The municipality of Mixtla de Altamirano is delimited to the north by Texhuacán, to the east by Zongolica, to the south by Tehuipango and to the west by Astacinga. It produces principally maize and coffee. In Mixtla de Altamirano, a celebration to honor San Andrés Apostol, patron of the town, takes place in December. The weather in Mixtla de Altamirano is very cold all year with rains in summer and autumn.

References

External links 

  Municipal Official webpage
  Municipal Official Information

Municipalities of Veracruz